Dwight Emerson Sargent (April 3, 1917 – April 4, 2002) was an American journalist.

Born in Pembroke, Massachusetts, he graduated in 1939 from Colby College and served in Europe with the United States Army during World War II.

Sargent worked at The Portland Press Herald in Maine and The Standard-Times of New Bedford, Massachusetts, before becoming a longtime editorial writer for The New York Herald Tribune.

He was a Nieman Fellow in 1951, studying local government. He was a curator for the Nieman Foundation for Journalism from 1964 to 1972. In 1978, he was appointed national editorial writer for Hearst Newspapers.

Sargent died of throat cancer on April 4, 2002.

References

1917 births
2002 deaths
American male journalists
20th-century American journalists
Nieman Fellows
Harvard University staff
United States Army personnel of World War II
Colby College alumni
People from Pembroke, Massachusetts
Deaths from throat cancer
Deaths from cancer in the United States